Sir Godfrey Kelly KCMG (21 December 1928 – 10 February 2022) was a Bahamian sailor, born in the Bahamas, who competed in the 1960, 1964, 1968, and 1972 Summer Olympics.

Kelly was educated at Queen's College, Nassau, and McDonogh College Prep School, Baltimore, before training in law at Cambridge University and Middle Temple, London. He served in the cabinet of Sir Roland Symonette as Minister of Education between 1964 and 1967.

Kelly was appointed Companion of the Order of St Michael and St George (CMG) in the 1999 Birthday Honours and promoted to Knight Commander in the 2020 New Year Honours. He died in Nassau on 10 February 2022, at the age of 93.

References

External links

1928 births
2022 deaths
Sportspeople from Nassau, Bahamas
Members of the Middle Temple
Alumni of the University of Cambridge
Bahamian male sailors (sport)
Olympic sailors of the Bahamas
Sailors at the 1960 Summer Olympics – Dragon
Sailors at the 1964 Summer Olympics – Dragon
Sailors at the 1968 Summer Olympics – Dragon
Sailors at the 1972 Summer Olympics – Dragon
Knights Commander of the Order of St Michael and St George
People in sports awarded knighthoods